Reinaldo Lima Siqueira (born September 18, 1981) is a Brazilian football manager and former player.

References

External links

1981 births
Living people
Brazilian footballers
Association football defenders
Alacranes de Durango footballers
Ascenso MX players
Brazilian expatriate footballers
Expatriate footballers in Mexico
Sportspeople from Minas Gerais